Ben Mitkus (born 23 December 1994) is a Swedish television personality and singer. He also maintains a YouTube channel with over 530,000 subscribers.

He came to Sweden from Lithuania with his family at the age of four and resides in Järfälla, Stockholm. He auditioned for Idol 2014, and also participated in the series Ung och bortskämd, broadcast on TV3, where he placed second in the final. Mitkus has a YouTube account, which in 2016 had 36 million views, where he posts videos of himself singing. Mitkus is signed to Universal Music.

In 2018, he participated in Farmen VIP along with several Swedish celebrities. He was the first celebrity to be eliminated from the Farm. In 2016, Mitkus released the single "Kills Me", which peaked at number 56 on the Sverigetopplistan singles chart.

Singles

Notes

References

Living people
1994 births
Swedish television personalities
21st-century Swedish singers
21st-century Swedish male singers